Leng may refer to:

 Leng (surname) (冷), a Chinese surname
 Leng (plateau), a fictional plateau